The Bugatti EB 110 is a mid-engine sports car produced by Bugatti Automobili S.p.A. from 1991 until 2002, when the company was liquidated. It was the only production model made by Romano Artioli's Italian incarnation of Bugatti.

History

Development of the EB 110 started in 1987 on the engine and chassis, with work being carried out by Tecnostile, headed by Tiziano Benedetti, Achille Bevini, and Oliviero Pedrazzi. The trio had worked on the Lamborghini Miura chassis and engine development and had subsequently established their own company which was known to Ferruccio Lamborghini and Paolo Stanzani who were involved in early talks with Romano Artioli. Stanzani was chosen as company Technical Director thanks to his career experience with the Miura, Espada and Countach.

Several designers received copies of the chassis drawings in order to propose styling for the bodywork: Paolo Martin, Giorgetto Giugiaro, Nuccio Bertone and Marcello Gandini. Bertone proposed a design prepared by Marc Deschamps (who went on to style the B.Engineering Edonis in 1999) but soon after lost interest in the project. That same design would be presented again as Bertone Lotus Emotion.
Giugiaro's ID90 prototype was presented some time later at the 1990 Turin Car Show.

Gandini gained wider acceptance by being well known to Stanzani and having worked on the styling of the Cizeta V16 which was powered by an engine designed by Tecnostile. Hence initial prototypes based on Gandini's design began testing in 1989.

Restyling 
Bugatti's President was not impressed by Gandini's angular design language incorporating a shovel nose and flared rear wheel arches and did not favour the aluminium honeycomb chassis design proposed by Stanzani. Gandini made a second iteration of the design with softer lines, revised front and rear lights, and subtly different proportions for the rear wheel arches – styling cues also visible in the Maserati Chubasco of 1991. Artioli, however, still did not approve and wanted further detail design changes which Gandini refused to make. Artioli thus tasked Gianpaolo Benedini (who had designed the "Blu Factory" prototype) to make the requested changes. The final vehicle design replaced the network of cooling ducts on the bonnet with ducts in the front bumper and at the outer flanks of the two large fixed headlamps which replaced the early prototype's pop-up units. The scissor doors, the large windshield, and the side window design were retained.

Change of chassis 
Conflicts of opinion with Artioli led to the respective departure of Gandini and Stanzani. The role of technical director was filled by Nicola Materazzi, who had a vast experience of working with Lancia, Ferrari and Cagiva, and had been Chief Engineer for the Stratos GR5, GTO Evoluzione, F40 and C589. One of the first tasks for Materazzi was that of improving the chassis torsional stiffness because the aluminium honeycomb prototype chassis were losing a fifth of their torsional stiffness after 30,000 test km and the test drivers were noticing poor vehicle handling. A new carbon fibre chassis was developed and supplied by Aerospatiale, giving the car the stiffness it needed to achieve its performance targets.
Materazzi also brought his engines experience to fix the problems which were affecting the engine's durability on the dynamometers (excessive friction between titanium con-rods in contact). He then moved on to re-calculating the front to rear torque distribution. Test drivers Jean-Philippe Vittecoq and Loris Bicocchi stated that the cars were understeering too much so Materazzi altered the torque distribution from 40:60 to 27:73 and the drivers were satisfied with the handling improvement.

The car had many innovative technologies that were scarcely used by the automotive industry at the time of its introduction such as a carbon fibre monocoque chassis, active aerodynamics, quad turbocharging (two per cylinder bank) and an all-wheel-drive system for better handling, the latter two being deemed by chief engineer Materazzi as "to tangle a doddle with a trifle". The design elements of the car paid homage to the distinctive Bugatti automobiles of the past. The name EB 110 is an abbreviation for the company's founder, Ettore Bugatti and his 110th birthday.

Unveiling and company financial difficulties 

The Bugatti EB 110 GT was unveiled on 15 September 1991, at both Versailles and in front of the Grande Arche de la Défense, near Paris, exactly 110 years after Ettore Bugatti's birth.

A lighter and more powerful variant with  called the EB 110 Super Sport was introduced at the 1992 Geneva Motor Show just six months after the introduction of the EB 110 GT.

Early in 1994, Formula One driver Michael Schumacher purchased a yellow EB 110 Super Sport, giving the company a great deal of publicity.  Soon after this, the car that Schumacher bought gained further publicity when Schumacher accidentally crashed his EB110 into a truck and blamed "inadaquate brakes" for the crash. Despite this, the car was repaired and Schumacher retained the car until 2003.

Derek Hill, son of American Formula One champion Phil Hill, was one of three drivers on a team that competed with an EB 110 in the United States at the 1996 24 Hours of Daytona.

Hard times hit the company in 1995 and as a result of chairman Artioli's over-ambitious purchase of Lotus Cars in addition to the company's quest to develop the EB112 four door saloon along with the negative exploitation of the company's suppliers, the company was bankrupt. Dauer Racing GmbH of Nuremberg, Germany, bought the semi-finished EB 110 cars in the assembly plant plus the parts inventory through the bankruptcy trustee. The remaining chassis were later developed by B Engineering into their Edonis sports car which uses the monocoque chassis of the EB 110 combined with a modified version of its engine.

Specifications 

The car has a 60-valve, quad-turbocharged V12 engine fed through 12 individual throttle bodies, powering all four wheels through a six-speed manual transmission.

The car uses a double wishbone suspension, with the chassis built by Aérospatiale, an aircraft company, and made from carbon fibre. Equipped with Gandini's trademark scissor doors, it has a glass engine cover that provides a view of the V12 engine. The GT is equipped with a speed-sensitive electronic rear wing and active air flaps near the rear window that can be raised at the flick of a switch manually, while the Super Sport has a fixed rear wing.

Performance

 0–: 2.6 seconds
 0–: 3.6 seconds
 0–: 6.5 seconds
 0–: 10.8 seconds
 0–: 14.0 seconds
 Standing kilometre: 21.3 seconds
 Top speed: 

Autocar tested the EB 110 GT on 16 March 1994:

 0–: 2.1 seconds
 0–: 4.5 seconds
 0–: 9.6 seconds
 0–: 23.2 seconds
 0–400 metre: 12.8 seconds at 
 0–1000 metre: 22.9 seconds at 
 Braking : 2.8 seconds

Road & Track tested a Bugatti EB 110 Super Sport and published the following results:

 0–: 2.2 seconds
 0–: 2.7 seconds
 0–: 3.4 seconds
 0–: 4.4 seconds
 0–: 5.3 seconds
 0–: 6.8 seconds
 0–: 7.8 seconds
 0–: 9.1 seconds
 0–: 10.9 seconds
 0–: 12.6 seconds
 Standing  mile (402 m): 12.5 seconds at 
 Braking : 112 ft
 Braking : 209 ft

The testers suspected that the acceleration numbers could be lowered considerably by using the clutch more recklessly than they did.

EB 110 continuation cars

Dauer EB 110

Dauer Sportwagen in Nuremberg, Germany, bought the remaining stock of EB 110 parts from the Bugatti factory after the company went bankrupt in 1995. A complete spare parts catalogue, with exploded diagrams and part numbers was made by the company. Three Super Sport models and a GT model were finished between 1999 and 2000 with the Bugatti logo and minor modifications.

The remaining incomplete chassis were used between 2001 and 2002 to manufacture five significantly improved cars called the Dauer EB110 Super Sport Light Weight.

The company Dauer Sportwagen went bankrupt in 2008. All original Bugatti parts, including the high performance parts of the EB 110 Super Sport and the equipment, were bought in 2011 by the company Toscana-Motors GmbH located in Kaiserslautern, Germany.

Cars based on the EB 110

B Engineering Edonis

The B Engineering Edonis is based on the Bugatti EB 110 Super Sport but has been extensively re-engineered, retaining little more than the carbon-fibre chassis from the original Bugatti sports car. It was conceived by Nicola Materazzi and styled by Marc Deschamps and introduced in 2000 with a complete exterior and interior redesign. The 3.5-litre Bugatti engine has had its displacement increased from 3,500 cc to 3,760 cc. The original four small IHI turbochargers have been replaced by two larger units from the same manufacturer. A version with 720 bhp set a speed of 359.6 km/h at the Nardo' proving ground in Italy.

The car weighing  has a power-to-weight ratio of 480 hp/ton. In addition, the engine's specific power output is an unprecedented 181 hp/litre. The brand claims a maximum speed of  while acceleration from 0 to  being achieved in 3.9 seconds. All changes were aimed at simplifying many technical issues which had been chosen by Stanzani and Artioli but which Materazzi felt were "making the easy difficult by using the un-necessary".

B Engineering planned to produce just 21 examples of the Edonis out of the parts retained by the company of the original EB 110 when Bugatti S.p.A. went bankrupt.

Apart from manufacturing the Edonis, B Engineering also provides spare parts and service for the original EB 110.

Aftermarket modifications

Brabus EB 110 

The Brabus EB 110 is a modified version of the EB 110 Super Sports by German automotive tuning company Brabus. The car has not received any exterior modifications by the company with most of the modifications done to the interior and engine. The car has a bi colour blue and black leather interior and a custom made quad pipe exhaust system. Engine modifications of the car along with its performance statistics remain unknown. This is the only EB 110 modified by the company. The car's existence was known after it was put on sale in 2013.

Motorsport
The EB 110 LM participated in the 24 Hours of Le Mans in 1994. The car qualified a very competitive 17th overall and 5th in the GT1 class but did not finish the race. The car is now on display at the Lohéac Automobile Museum. A second car commissioned by wealthy pharmaceutical entrepreneur Martino Finotto also participated in the 1996 24 Hours of Daytona, but suffered a gearbox problem and did not finish.

See also 

 Timeline of most powerful production cars

References

External links

The Bugatti EB 110 Registry

EB110
Rear mid-engine, all-wheel-drive vehicles
Sports cars
Cars introduced in 1991
Cars of Italy